Bill Young (born  July 5, 1947 in St. Catharines, Ontario) is a retired professional ice hockey player who played 142 games in the World Hockey Association.  He played with the Los Angeles Sharks, Cleveland Crusaders, and Minnesota Fighting Saints.

References

External links

1947 births
Living people
Canadian ice hockey left wingers
Cleveland Crusaders players
Greensboro Generals (EHL) players
Sportspeople from St. Catharines
Los Angeles Sharks players
Minnesota Fighting Saints players
Ice hockey people from Ontario
Winston-Salem Polar Twins (SHL) players